Rareş Daniel Chintoan (born 13 January 1983 in Cluj-Napoca) is a Romanian freestyle wrestler who competes in the under 120 kg weight class. He competed in the 120 kg events at the 2008 and 2012 Summer Olympics and was eliminated in the 1/8 finals at both.

References

External links
 

1983 births
Living people
Romanian male sport wrestlers
Olympic wrestlers of Romania
Wrestlers at the 2004 Summer Olympics
Wrestlers at the 2008 Summer Olympics
Wrestlers at the 2012 Summer Olympics
Sportspeople from Cluj-Napoca
Wrestlers at the 2015 European Games
Wrestlers at the 2019 European Games
European Games competitors for Romania
20th-century Romanian people
21st-century Romanian people